Leandro Higo (born January 19, 1989) is a Brazilian mixed martial artist who competes in the Bantamweight division of Bellator MMA. A professional competitor since 2006, he has also competed for Resurrection Fighting Alliance and Legacy Fighting Alliance. As of June 28, 2022, he is #7 in the Bellator Bantamweight Rankings.

Mixed martial arts career

Early career
Higo made his Resurrection Fighting Alliance debut on August 21, 2015 vs. Terrion Ware at RFA 29, winning by rear-naked choke at the end of round 3. Following a first round victory over Melvin Blumer at RFA 32, he won the RFA Bantamweight title with a first round rear-naked choke victory against Joey Miolla at RFA 37.

Higo made his debut with Legacy Fighting Alliance in the company's debut at LFA 1: Peterson vs. Higo, defeating Steven Peterson via unanimous decision to win the inaugural LFA Bantamweight Championship.

The Ultimate Fighter Brazil
Higo competed in the Bantamweight division on The Ultimate Fighter: Brazil 4. He defeated Maycon Silvan in the elimination round via first round arm-triangle choke, but was eliminated in the quarterfinals by Bruno Rodrigues Mesquita via first round rear-naked choke. After Giovanni Santos was forced to leave the season due to an infection, Higo reluctantly accepted to replace Santos to face Matheus Mattos in another quarterfinal bout. However, his rib injury sustained in the previous week's bout with Mesquita worsened and he was forced to withdraw.

Bellator MMA
Higo made his Bellator debut as a late replacement for Darrion Caldwell against Bantamweight titlist Eduardo Dantas in a non-title bout at Bellator 177, losing via split decision.

Higo faced Joe Taimanglo on October 6, 2017 at Bellator 184, winning via unanimous decision.

Higo earned an opportunity to compete for the Bellator Bantamweight Championship vs. Darrion Caldwell on March 2, 2018 at Bellator 195, losing via first round guillotine choke.

For his next bout, Higo moved up to Featherweight and faced Aaron Pico at Bellator 206 on September 29, 2018. He lost the fight via technical knockout in round one.

After the failed attempt in featherweight division, Higo returned to the bantamweight division to face Shawn Bunch at Bellator 228 on September 28, 2019. He won the fight via submission in the second round. Subsequently he signed a new exclusive, multi-fight contract with Bellator.

Higo was expected to face Johnny Campbell in a bantamweight bout at Bellator 241 on March 13, 2020. However, Campbell withdrew from the bout due to an injury and was replaced by Dominic Mazzotta, the bout continuing as a featherweight bout.

Higo then faced Ricky Bandejas at Bellator 249 on October 15, 2020. Higo missed the contracted weight, but went on to win the bout via second-round submission.

Higo faced Darrion Caldwell at Bellator 259 on May 21, 2021. At the weigh-ins, Higo weighed in at 137.5 pounds, one and a half pounds over the bantamweight non-title fight limit. The bout proceeded at catchweight and Higo was fined a percentage of his purse, which went to Caldwell. Higo won the bout via split decision.

Bellator Featherweight World Grand Prix 
Higo faced Danny Sabatello in the quarter-finals of the Bellator Bantamweight World Grand Prix at Bellator 282 on June 24, 2022. He lost the bout via unanimous decision.

Higo was scheduled to face James Gallagher on March 10, 2023 at Bellator 292. However, in Mid February, Gallagher pulled out of the bout due to unknown reasons.

Personal life 
Higo has a son.

Mixed martial arts record

|-
|Loss
|align=center|21–6
|Danny Sabatello
|Decision (unanimous)
|Bellator 282
|
|align=center|5
|align=center|5:00
|Uncasville, Connecticut, United States
|
|-
|Win
|align=center|21–5
|Darrion Caldwell
|Decision (split)
|Bellator 259 
|
|align=center|3
|align=center|5:00
|Uncasville, Connecticut, United States
|
|-
|Win
|align=center|20–5
|Ricky Bandejas
|Submission (rear-naked choke)
|Bellator 249
|
|align=center|2
|align=center|2:32
|Uncasville, Connecticut, United States
|
|-
|Win
|align=center|19–5
|Shawn Bunch
|Submission (guillotine choke)
|Bellator 228
|
|align=center|2
|align=center|4:34
|Inglewood, California, United States
|
|-
| Loss
| align=center| 18–5
| Aaron Pico
| TKO (elbow and punches)
| Bellator 206
| 
| align=center| 1
| align=center| 3:19
| San Jose, California, United States
| 
|-
| Loss
| align=center| 18–4
| Darrion Caldwell
| Submission (guillotine choke)
| Bellator 195
| 
| align=center| 1
| align=center| 2:36
| Thackerville, Oklahoma, United States
| 
|-
| Win
| align=center| 18–3
| Joe Taimanglo
| Decision (unanimous)
| Bellator 184
| 
| align=center| 3
| align=center| 5:00
| Thackerville, Oklahoma, United States
| 
|-
| Loss
| align=center| 17–3
| Eduardo Dantas
| Decision (split)
| Bellator 177
| 
| align=center| 3
| align=center| 5:00
| Budapest, Hungary
| 
|-
| Win
| align=center| 17–2
| Steven Peterson
| Decision (unanimous)
| LFA 1: Peterson vs. Higo
| 
| align=center| 5
| align=center| 5:00
| Dallas, Texas, United States
| 
|-
| Win
| align=center| 16–2
| Joey Miolla
| Technical Submission (rear-naked choke)
| RFA 37
| 
| align=center| 1
| align=center| 2:07
| Sioux Falls, South Dakota, United States
| 
|-
| Win
| align=center| 15–2
| Melvin Blumer
| TKO (punches)
| RFA 32
| 
| align=center| 1
| align=center| 2:58
| Prior Lake, Minnesota, United States
| 
|-
| Win
| align=center| 14–2
| Terrion Ware
| Submission (rear-naked choke)
| RFA 29
| 
| align=center| 3
| align=center| 4:58
| Sioux Falls, South Dakota, United States
| 
|-
|Win
|align=center|13–2
|Eduardo de Souza Silva
|Submission (rear-naked choke)
|Coliseu Extreme Fight 7
|
|align=center|2
|align=center|2:33
|Alagoas, Brazil
|
|-
|Win
|align=center|12–2
|Francisco Antonio Araujo Rodrigues
|Submission (rear-naked choke)
|Arena Fight 5
|
|align=center|1
|align=center|2:42
|Rio Grande Do Norte, Brazil
|
|-
|Win
|align=center|11–2
|Alex Silva
|Decision (unanimous)
|Conquista Kombat Championship 
|
|align=center|3
|align=center|5:00
|Bahia, Brazil
|
|-
| Win
| align=center| 10–2 
| Janailson Kevin Pereira Lima
| Submission (rear-naked choke)
| Fort MMA 2
| 
| align=center| 2
| align=center| 4:04
| Rio Grande Do Norte, Brazil
| 
|-
| Loss
| align=center| 9–2
| Iliarde Santos
| Decision (unanimous)
| Jungle Fight 38
| 
| align=center| 3
| align=center| 5:00
| Pará, Brazil
| 
|-
| Win
| align=center| 9–1
| Erinaldo dos Santos Rodrigues
| Decision (unanimous)
| WFE 11
| 
| align=center| 3
| align=center| 5:00
| Bahia, Brazil
| 
|-
| Win
| align=center| 8–1
| Wagner Campos
| Decision (unanimous)
| WFE 10
| 
| align=center| 3
| align=center| 5:00
| Bahia, Brazil
| 
|-
| Loss
| align=center| 7–1
| Marcos Vinicius Costa Silva
| TKO (retirement)
| Recife Fighting Championship 2
| 
| align=center| 2
| align=center| 3:58
| Pernambuco, Brazil
| 
|-
| Win
| align=center| 7–0
| Dudu Dudu
| KO (punch)
| Nocaute Fight
| 
| align=center| 1
| align=center| 3:05
| Rio Grande Do Norte, Brazil
| 
|-
| Win
| align=center| 6–0
| Gleidson Alves Martins
| Submission (triangle armbar)
| Guamare Fight 1
| 
| align=center| 1
| align=center| 1:45
| Rio Grande Do Norte, Brazil
| 
|-
| Win
| align=center| 5–0
| Arivaldo Batista da Silva
| KO (punch)
| Nordeste Fight Vale Tudo 4
| 
| align=center| 1
| align=center| 4:12
| Rio Grande Do Norte, Brazil
| 
|-
| Win
| align=center| 4–0
| Diego Tubarao
| Submission (armbar)
| Nordeste Fight Vale Tudo 4
| 
| align=center| 1
| align=center| 2:50
| Rio Grande Do Norte, Brazil
| 
|-
| Win
| align=center| 3–0
| Jose Mario Tome
| Submission (armbar) 
| Arena Fight - Limoeiro 4
| 
| align=center| 1
| align=center| 0:39
| Ceara, Brazil
| 
|-
| Win
| align=center| 2–0
| Rodrigo Barbosa
| Submission (triangle choke) 
| MZI: Fight 3
| 
| align=center| 2
| align=center| 1:49
| Rio Grande Do Norte, Brazil
| 
|-
| Win
| align=center| 1–0
| Gilson Gilson
| Submission (armbar)
| Nordeste Mega Fight Vale Tudo 2
| 
| align=center| 2
| align=center| 1:50
| Rio Grande Do Norte, Brazil
|

Mixed martial arts exhibition record

|-
|Loss 
|align=center| 1–1
|Reginaldo Vieira
|Submission (rear-naked choke)
|The Ultimate Fighter: Brazil 4
| (airdate)
|align=center|1
|align=center|4:04
|Las Vegas, Nevada, United States
|
|- 
|Win 
|align=center| 1–0
|Maycon Silvan
|Submission (arm triangle choke) 
|The Ultimate Fighter: Brazil 4
| (airdate)
|align=center|1
|align=center|3:17
|Las Vegas, Nevada, United States
|
|-

See also
 List of current Bellator fighters
 List of male mixed martial artists

References

External links
 
 

1989 births
Living people
Brazilian male mixed martial artists
Bantamweight mixed martial artists
Mixed martial artists utilizing Brazilian jiu-jitsu
Bellator male fighters
Brazilian practitioners of Brazilian jiu-jitsu
People awarded a black belt in Brazilian jiu-jitsu